The CfC-Stanbic Bank Magnate is a Kenyan business reality television show in which 14 participants compete in an elimination-style competition for a top prize of KSh.1.5 million/= (US$15,000) as seed capital for their business. The show typically ends with the 3 board members eliminating one of the contestants with the catch phrase, "You Have to Go!". The slogan of the show is "Winning is Just the Beginning".

The show first aired in October 27, 2011 and it's on its first season.

Idea 
The CfC-Stanbic Bank Magnate is a reality television show that starts with a group of participants vying to earn a top prize of KSh.1.5 million/= (US$15,000) as seed capital for their business idea. The participants are drawn from diverse backgrounds and regions across Kenya. During the show, these contestants live in close quarters testing their social skills as they balance co-operation with competition. The participants are placed into teams, and each week are assigned a task and required to select a team leader for the task. The winning team advances to the next task, while the losing team remains in the boardroom where the board members determine the person to go and is automatically eliminated from the show.

Eliminations involves the losing team being confronted with their loss in a boardroom meeting. The team leader is then asked to select one of their team members who was the weakest link. The board members then determine who has to go as well as put on probation participants whom they believe underperformed in the task assigned.

The board members reserves the right at times to do the following: not allow the losing team leader to determine who has to go, and to let go multiple people who were on probation from the previous task and performed poorly on the task assigned. The board members also discourage quitting.

Selection 

The show aimed at identifying and recruiting young extraordinary business minds in Kenya with limited resources but have much zeal to achieve their entrepreneurial dreams. Over 800 applicants all over Kenya applied to participate in The Magnate whereby 96 participants were short listed for the interviews in Nairobi where they presented their brilliant ideas to a panel of judges. The best 14 participants were then contacted to participate in the show. The participants are then assigned different rigorous tasks based on typical Kenyan business scenarios whereby they are expected to perform with excellence.

Board Members 
The board members are outstanding Kenyan entrepreneurs who have excelled by establishing companies worth billions of shillings. They Include:

Dr. Catherine Masitsa Rozsa
She started off as a veterinary surgeon, going on to create a successful career in various multi-national organizations before her entrepreneurial spirit led her to start her own company. She transformed the wedding industry into a billion-shilling industry in Kenya by her outfit Samantha's Bridal which now is Africa's leading wedding brand. She also Publishes other popular business and lifestyle magazines.

Mr. Gerald Wamalwa
He quit employment at the age of 28 to start his own company Mellech Engineering and Construction. Starting with only one pick-up and zero capital, he transformed the company to a leading giant in the construction industry in Kenya with a turnover of over a billion Kenya shillings. His company was named the best top 100 Mid-Sized Companies in East Africa in 2009 and runners up position in Africa Awards 2011. On December 16, 2011, he was ranked among the Top 40 Under 40 Men in Kenya for his work at Mellech Group where he is the founder and Managing Director.

Mr. Moses Nderitu
He is a serial entrepreneur, pursuing business opportunities whenever he spots them. He is famously known as the brains behind Excloosive Mobile Toilets that revolutionized the sanitation industry in Kenya especially for outdoor functions. He was ranked among the Top 40 Under 40 men in Kenya for his achievements at Excloosive Limited where he is the Founder and Managing Director(MD).

Participants

Episode 1
Episode 1 covered the interviews of the 96 shortlisted participants out of the over 800 people who applied to participate in the show. The hopefuls underwent rigorous scrutiny to determine the 14 participants that will proceed to The Magnate Mansion. The interviews took place in Nairobi. This episode aired on October 27, 2011

Episode 2
The 14 participants chosen are introduced to the board members where they are given 2 minutes to present their idea briefly. At the mansion, they trained on disaster management, team building and entrepreneurial mentoring classes. They were divided to 2 teams namely

Team Deli fresh
	
Members	
 Anne Githu - Team Leader
 David Kamunde Mwirigi
 Kenneth Ng'enoh
 Lina Marie
 Peter Ruhiu Njogu
 Ryan Johnstone
 William Waweru

Team Ultimate

Members		
 Silvanus Osoro Onyiego - Team Leader
 Kahara Kiarie
 Paul Mwige
 Roy Nyagah Muriuki
 Idah Maina
 Vivien Mutimbia
 Washington Koimbori
The first task required the contestants to supplying fresh produce to Tuskys Supermarket in Nairobi. They were to go to the local market and purchase various fresh produce requires by their customer (supermarket manager) then sell to him at a profit. The team with the highest profits margins wins. They were then to prepare a report on the task assigned to them at the boardroom where the board members were to assess and determine the winner. The task tested on Time Management, Profitability, Ethics and Compliance with the Law, Pricing and Crisis Management. Team Deli fresh had some of the products rejected due to poor packing while Team Ultimate managed to sell all their produce. In the Board room, it was a straight victory for Team Ultimate with a profit margin of 10% while Team Deli Fresh made a loss of over KSh.1,200/=. The board members were not impressed by the 10% profit margin made by Team Ultimate but in the end it was Team Deli Fresh that had to lose one member. In the board room, Team Deli Fresh made even more mistakes by presenting the wrong figures to board members as well as not nominating one member who was the weakest link to take blame. Peter Ruhiu Njogu decided to quit which did not go well with the board members and had to go and subsequently leaves the show. Anne Githu, Kenneth Ng'enoh and David Kamunde Mwirigi were put on probation for lack of focus, presentation of wrong data as well as the team leader lack of leadership. This episode aired on November 3, 2011

Episode 3
This episode aired on November 10, 2011 on Kenyan TV Stations: Kiss TV and KBC at 8 PM EAT. (It is also available on their official website for viewing.) The remaining 13 participants remaining had had a reality check having been through the first board appearance and consequent eviction in the previous episode. They were more keen and highly anticipated the next task.

Week 2 began with a motivational session in the house. This was conducted by Susan Koinange (MD Koba Waters Ltd.) She encouraged the participants to form 'master-mind groups' or 'likeness teams.' These teams were to meet often in order to keep the team members inspired. She used the metaphor of making 'apple juice with the apples given to them.'

The task briefing was delivered differently. Instead of the Board meeting the participants and informing them, it was presented to them at the house by Kirika Kirimi in a sealed envelope. They were instructed to read the contents within and discuss it within 30 minutes. In addition, they were to nominate 1 participant who was to be 'immune' from eviction that week.

The Task brief of 2 November 2011 was read to the entire team by Roy Muriuki. It read:
 ...following last week's contest, the board was displeased and was of the feeling that neither of the teams executed the tasks with the diligence it deserved. To this end, the Board has decided to not personally attend the briefing. The Board sincerely hopes that this week's task will be taken more seriously and executed in a more fitting fashion...

On the tasks at hand: 
 ...the car & the upholstery cleaning business is expanding rapidly in Kenya from high end car washes to the less tech enabled ones across the country, business is brisk, the common denominator for all these businesses however is whether they are able to get customers to their businesses or not and how mush money  they make. 
You will be required to run a car wash business for your next task... you will take care of everything that concerns the business for the day. This task will be executed between 8 AM - 3 PM. Remember, profitability is what dictates the growth of any business...

The previous 2 teams had been

Team Deli fresh
	
Members	
 Anne Githu - Team Leader
 David Kamunde Mwirigi
 Kenneth Ng'enoh
 Lina Marie
 Ryan Johnstone
 William Waweru

Team Ultimate

Members		
 Silvanus Osoro Onyiego - Team Leader
 Kahara Kiarie
 Paul Mwige
 Roy Nyagah Muriuki
 Idah Maina
 Vivien Mutimbia
 Washington Koimbori

The second task brought the contestants to DGM Car Wash in Nairobi. Team Ultimate had deliberated to charge a minimum of KSh.150/= per car and were willing to go as high as the client seemed able to afford whereas Team Deli Fresh had decided to range between KSh.200/= - KSh.250/=. They were welcomed by the proprietor 'Caroline' and briefly oriented.  She then gave them an envelope containing further instructions from the Board for them.

They were instructed to form 2 new teams ensuring that not more than 4 members form the previous teams were to be together again in the new teams! This was to be completed within 30 minutes.

The new teams 

TEAM ULTIMATE

Kiarie Kihara - Team Leader
Roy Muriuki
Paul Mwige
Ann Githu
David Kamunde
Washington Koimburi

ULTIMATE HUSTLERS

Ryan Johnstone - Team Leader
Lina Marie
Vivien Mutimbia
Idah Maina
Sylvanus Osoro
Kenneth Ng'enoh
William Waweru

The challenges arising among the teams
 Duty allocation / division of labour
 Equipment preparation
 Customer acquisition
 Competing for the same clients (both teams were at the same car wash, getting cars from the same highway)
 The equipment not being versatile enough (e.g. the washing pipes being too short to reach all areas of some trucks to be washed.)
 Customer complaints
 Customers bargaining for the lowest price
 Convincing potential clients to pop in for a wash
 Stealing each other's clients
 Some dissatisfied clients
 Weather change (it began to pour rather heavily)
 Coordination between the sales team & the work-force
 Pulling in more cars than they could handle at a given time
 Washing the cars in a rush hence not cleaning them satisfactorily
 Having to pay for venue (which they discovered after they were done for the day)

Strategies
 The two teams each divided themselves into two groups; one went out to market themselves and attract clients while the other got down to cleaning the cars that came through!
 The sales teams were cut-throat - literally bringing traffic to a standstill!
 The teams using the rain - interruption of workflow to strategize further
 When told of the rental charge that they had overlooked, they bargained to cut down their losses

Point of caution
 The Task wasn't about washing cars but about running a car wash!

In The Board Room

Characteristics to remember about each Board member

Gerald Wamalwa
Seeks integrity & excellence and does not tolerate short cuts

Dr. Catherine Masitsa
Seeks the daring entrepreneur who is out to seize the chance

Moses Nderitu
Seeks the perceptive entrepreneur with an eye for opportunity who's willing to risk it

What the Board members observed

Gerald Wamalwa
 The Set price for washing a car at the car wash was set at KSh.150/= whereas some of the teams were charging higher than that.
 This was a manual task and so cars were to be done one at a time
 Financials would have to be discussed further because the bottom-line did not reflect well

Dr. Catherine Masitsa
 Although profit was a key objective, it should not have been sought at the cost of customer satisfaction and quality assurance

Moses Nderitu
 Some team members got into the clients' cars in order to lead them to the car wash, a violation of personal space
 They were at liberty to utilize the 'manpower' at the car wash
 The team leaders should have gone to negotiate with for additional labor since they were clearly overwhelmed hence finding out what the charge to be levied on them would be and then consider this

Boardroom Session

  Board: The action of not going back to the proprietor of the business to ask for insight
   on how the business is run is as good as deciding that you have no need to understand the dynamics
  of that particular business!
  Board:  The teams did not understand the system and mechanisms involved and also manage 
  all business aspects the same way that the original owner would do

Episode 4

Training sessions 
The contestants had a vigorous training session on Business Concepts and Models facilitated by Ruth Ogier of InvesteQ Capital Ltd. This enabled the contestants to set and know their goals as well as get the best out of their businesses.

Task
The task briefing took place at Decor Den Office in Nairobi West by Nina Senanu, the proprietor of Decor Den. Task entailed interior design and furnishing Decor Den's new office in Nairobi west which was to serve corporate and home clients all in a budget of KSh.500,000/= (approximately US$5,600). The task was to be judged by the best idea and the best layout of the office. The contestants were divided into two teams;

Team Synergy

Members
Lina Marie - Team Leader
Sylvanus Osoro
William Waweru
Vivien Mutimbia
Idah Maina
Kenneth Ng'eno

Team Ultimate Consultants

Members
Washington Koimbori - Team Leader
David Kamunde
Ann Githu
Roy Muriuki
Paul Mwige

The teams were allowed to use Interior design consultants to advise on what is required. After shopping around for the suitable furniture, the office model as well as a three-dimensional (3D) soft copy showing the office space the teams went to present their proposal to their client, Nina Senanu, proprietor - Decor Den. Team Synergy provided four services namely interior decor, furniture, signage, and marketing the new location. They had two scenarios for the room. Scenario 1 had a green carpet while scenario 2 had red carpet.
Team Ultimate consultants divided the office into four zones: the wet zone, workstation area, the boardroom and the reception area. After the presentation, The proprietor, Decor Den met the board members to brief them on the teams performance. Team Ultimate

Boardroom sessions
In the boardroom, Team synergy were faulted on presenting that they had experience on interior design yet they had just started working. The board also faulted their office model which did not meet the standards of the client thus handing team Ultimate easy victory. Team Synergy remained in the boardroom for the eviction. The team leader, Lina was asked to pick two members she thought were weak to remain in the boardroom. She picked Idah and William. Finally, the board members deliberated and decided that the team failed for not understanding the client and the product she wanted by presenting a substandard product. The board decided that Lina and Idah were put on probation. William was appointed the team leader in the next task. Kenneth who was in charge of the design and the office model which was the main reason why they failed had to go. This episode was aired on November 17, 2011.

Episode 5

Training session
The contestants had a motivation session facilitated by Daniel Mungai - Chef, Emma Daniel Creations. The session centered around entrepreneurship and the challenges one has to undergo to be successful.

Task
The task entailed selling tickets for the fifth puppetry festival at the Kenya National Theatre.  They were to create a sales and marketing strategy. They were briefed by Tony Mboyo, producer, Kenya National Theater. The contestants were divided into two teams:

Team Synergy

Members
William Waweru - Team Leader
Sylvanus Osoro
Vivien Mutimbia
Lina Marie
Idah Maina

Team Ultimate

Members
David Kamunde - Team Leader
Washington Koimbori
Roy Muriuki
Ann Githu
Paul Mwige

After brainstorming on the sales and marketing strategy, the teams presented to Annabel Karanja - Marketing Specialist and Trainer, InvesteQ Capital Ltd. During presentation, Team Synergy had a missing slide on the financial projection thus throwing the team in panic. The then hit the streets to sell 100 tickets for the show. Team synergy targeted the motorists and the pedestrians using direct sale. Team Ultimate targeted shop retailers but changed quickly to target the corporate.

Boardroom session
In the boardroom, the teams had a brief recap of their sales and marketing strategy as well as what they did when selling the tickets. Team Ultimate was put to task on their marketing plan since they estimated that they were going to sell 200 tickets yet they were given 100 tickets to sell. There were some light moments when David said the figure was imaginary and no facts was used to support this. Paul was grilled for presenting a financial projection with wrong addition figures. On the other hand, Team Synergy didn't include the sales Projections in their financial analysis. There was a heated argument between the board members and David, the team leader of team Ultimate for not having any solid basis to rank his fellow team members as well as using "Imaginary" "I have no idea" and "I just thought". When the final scores were tallied out of 100 points, Team Synergy had 45.7 points while Team Ultimate had 59 points. This automatically made Team Ultimate the winners. Team Synergy remained in the boardroom for the eviction. The team leader, William blamed Idah for poor financial presentation and analysis yet the board had identified the team lost due to poor presentation. Finally the board decided since Idah was in charge of financial projection which was missing during presentation as well as being on probation on the previous task, she had to go. William and Lina were put on probation. This episode was aired on November 24, 2011.

Episode 6

Training session
The contestants underwent a vigorous training on operations management facilitated by Gabriel Macharia - Operations Management, InvesteQ Capital.

Task
The task entailed a board based business simulation that tested their leadership skills, decision making skills, level of understanding, ability to learn and communicate, financial knowledge and general business acumen which was conducted by David Tanki of Lan-X Africa Ltd. The contestants were divided into three teams:
Touch Limited

Members
Roy Muriuki
David Kamunde
William Waweru

Firestorm Limited

Members
Washington Koimbori
Lina Marie
Ann Githu

Eagles Limited

Members
Vivien Mutimbia
Sylvanus Osoro
Paul Mwige

The board based simulation was for the contestants to run a business which had employees, assets, expenses and money. The task required the contestants to produce and sell three products: Brown product worth KSh.3,000/= per piece, Yellow product worth KSh.2,000/= per piece and a Blue product worth KSh.1,000/= per piece. The tems were to prepare quotations based on their production and make bids for the customers who need a combination of all three products. The task required the contestants to bid for the most valuable combination of products while keeping the cost of production as low as possible. They were to be evaluated based on price, service, quality and credit terms. On the first day, Touch limited won since it was the lowest bidder. When reviewing the task and setting up the price controls, one member of Touch Limited, William, isolated himself from the rest of the team. On the second day, the teams decided to merge, share customers since they didn't have enough resources. they also developed a common pricing system. Finally, the teams results were tallied and were as follows:

Touch limited won for having the highest net profit.

Boardroom session
In the boardroom the teams was put to task on the reason for merger. In the process, it was discovered that they did not include a mark up of KSh.15,000/= but some teams did not. This brought up disagreements among the teams. Even though Touch Limited won, they were put to task for not presenting financial statement and balance sheets. William was put on the chopping board for abandoning his team during the price negotiation period. According to the evaluation, the contestants were graded and were as follows; Roy - 24, David - 23, William - 16, Vivien - 22, Paul - 23, Sylvanus - 21, Washington - 24, Lina - 17, Ann - 21. William having the fewest points in the rankings as well as he had been on probation in the previous task, he had to go. Lina and Sylvanus were put on probation. This episode was aired on December 1, 2011.

Episode 7

Training session
The contestants had a training session facilitated by Esther Mukaya of Google Kenya on the need for businesses to create websites and ways to reach customers using websites.

Task
The week's task was delivered inform of a site visit to the Soft and Lovely factory in Nairobi where they toured thereafter on the task briefed on by Michael Kimani - Manager, Soft and Lovely Company. The task was to create an advertising campaign on various products made by the company. They were then allowed to consult Redsky advertising on the best approach for their campaign. The contestants were in two teams namely:

Team Aspire

Members
Vivien Mutimbia - Team Leader
David Kamunde
Ann Githu
Lina Marie

Team Ultimate

Members
Paul Mwige - Team leader
Sylvanus Osoro
Roy Muriuki
Washington Koimbori

Team Aspire set the ball rolling by brainstorming then shooting a commercial on the Soft and Lovely braid spray using "Tokelezea" (Slang for emerge) as their catchphrase for the TV commercial. During editing of the video commercial a rift developed on team aspire on the need to include other products as well as the need to include the company and where to place it. Team Ultimate decided not to have a TV commercial instead used a radio advert and fliers. Both teams then presented their final ad to the Soft and Lovely MD and Jerry Nyagah, Creative Director, Redsky Advertising. The board was then briefed on how the teams performed.

Boardroom session
Both teams had to brief the board on the task. Team Aspire gave wrong financial projections to the board which did not go well with the board. Team Ultimate projected that the client will spend KSh.1.6 million/= then make sales of the same amount but they forgot to put a disclaimer on how long to make a profit. They also focused on use of banners and fliers which was not practical since most people don't read. Team Aspire ultimately won the task for creating a good advertisement campaign as well as practical solutions as well as their catchphrase "Tokelezea" which was trendy.         
Team Ultimate was put to task why they didn't get the market brief, Market target and the creative right. The board identified that Roy Muriuki was in charge of the creative and Sylvanus who was in charge of Market brief. The board was also infuriated by the contestants not owning up to the task they were doing. The board determined that the team lost because of poor message delivery, a task done by Roy Muriuki who was in charge of creative thus he had to go. The board also decided that Sylvanus was in charge of Market briefing as well as defining the target market which led to them losing the task. Sylvanus who was also on probation made it worse for him thus he had to go home. The team leader Paul Mwige was put on Probation. This episode was aired on December 8, 2011.

Episode 8

Site Viewing
The contestants visited Kitengela Hot Glass where the owner, Anselm Croze facilitated the tour round the factory as well as advising the contestants on how to maintain a successful business

Task
The task was for the contestants to advise a client (Stephen Gugu, Investment Director - InVhestia Africa) who wants to start a Financial Investment Training Business. This task was done individually. They had personal sessions to know more thereafter to advise and present what the client needs to do. This was to test what they have learned so far at the Magnate Mansion. After the presentation, the client met the board members to present the strengths and weaknesses of the contestants as follows:

Boardroom Sessions

In the boardroom, the contestants were to explain what steps they took to advise the client. The Board asked questions according to the advice they gave the client. The contestants were evaluated then ranked according to:
The quality of questions asked and time management
Presentation of the plan
Market analysis
Refining of the value proposition
Recommendations given

The ranking scale was as follows: 1-Below Expectation, 2-Below Average, 3-Just met expectation, 4-Above average, 5- Exceeded expectation. On the task, the contestants scored as follows:

David Kamunde and Ann Githu had to leave the Magnate Mansion for having the fewest points and having performed below expectation. This meant that Paul Mwige, Vivien Mutimbia, Washington Koimbori and Lina Marie qualified for the finals. This episode was aired on December 15, 2011.

Season Finale

This was the Season Finale whereby the final four contestants were to pitch their business plans to a panel of Judges. The four finalists were

Lina Marie - Maya Expo
Paul Mwige - MD, Pems Autozone
Vivien Mutimbia -  Director, Safari Hunters
Washington Koimbori - Pectin Manufacturing Factory

The finals were held at One Degree South Eco Boutique Hotel in Westlands (Nairobi) where the winner was announced. The board members were joined by a panel of Judges who were as follows:
Ken Ouko - Head of Corporate Banking, CfC Stanbic Bank
Terry Mungai - Ashleys Executive Salon
Allan Ogendo - InvesteQ Capital
Christine Kapkusum - Senior Associate, Portfolio - Acumen Fund

The contestants were then given 10 minutes to pitch their ideas to the judges then a question and answer session. After the presentation, the judges were to fill a scorecard on that particular contestants pitch and award marks according to: Quality of the presentation, The problem the contestants are trying to solve, The product that is coming to the market, How well the contestants understand the market they are trying to penetrate (Market Analysis) and Financial plan.

Pitch

Lina Marie - Maya Expo, a web portal to give an insight on how to maintain a youthful appearance ranging from diet, exercise to extremes like buttocks and plastic surgery. The investment (Price money) was to be used for:
Upgrading the website into a portal
Portal optimization
Hire key staff
The strengths included the marketing structure of the proposal. Some of the drawbacks for the proposal included, understanding the current market due to inflation, costing structure and cash flow (cash Burn rate before returns are seen).

Paul Mwige - Pems Autozone, a transport logistics and fleet management solutions. The investment (price money) was to be used for purchasing cars. The strengths included diversity of the product. Some of the drawbacks included financial projections (low net margins), investing in areas with low returns.

Vivien Mutimbia - Mkenya Mtalii, a product to encourage domestic tourism targeting saccos. The Investment (price money) was to be used for:
Setting office in Nairobi to co-ordinate activities
Video production
Boost marketing cost
The strengths included good returns, clear market and good financial market analysis. Some of the drawbacks included no clear strategy for the products

Washington Koimbori - Pectin Manufacturing Factory from fruits. The investment was to be used on setting up a Pectin factory in Kenya utilizing the available raw materials as well as having Pectin readily available locally. The strengths included innovation and viability. Some of the weaknesses include financial projections and practicability of the project since it has not started.

RESULTS

After the pitch, the scores tallied were as follows

Vivien Mutimbia won KSh.1,500,000/= as the winner of The CfC-Stanbic Bank Magnate Season 1

Kenyan reality television series
2011 Kenyan television series debuts
2011 Kenyan television series endings
2010s Kenyan television series
Kenya Broadcasting Corporation original programming